Lebo Junior-Senior High School is a public high school located in Lebo, Kansas, in the Lebo–Waverly USD 243 school district, serving students in grades 6–12. Lebo has an enrollment of approximately 80 students. The principal is Duane Ford. The school mascot is the Wolves and the school colors are red, black, and white.

Extracurricular activities
The Wolves compete in the Lyon County League. The KSHSAA classification switches between 2A and 1A, the two lowest classes according to KSHSAA. The school also has a variety of organizations for the students to participate in.

Athletics
The Wolves compete in the Lyon County League and are classified as either 2A or 1A, two of the lowest classifications in Kansas according to KSHSAA. A majority of the sports are coached by the same coaches. Lebo Junior-Senior High School offers the following sports:

 Fall Sports
 Cheerleading
 Cross Country
 Football
 Volleyball

 Winter
 Boys' Basketball
 Girls' Basketball
 Cheerleading

 Spring
 Boys' Track and Field
 Girls' Track and Field
Girls' Softball
Boys' Baseball

Organizations
 Art
 Band
 Choir
 Family, Career, and Community Leaders of America (FCCLA)
 Future Business Leaders of America (FBLA)
 Future Farmers of America (FFA)
 Journalism
 National Honor Society (NHS)
 Scholars Bowl
 Spanish
 Student Council (StuCo)

See also
 Waverly High School
 Lebo-Waverly USD 243
 List of high schools in Kansas
 List of unified school districts in Kansas

References

External links
 School Website
 District Website

Public high schools in Kansas
Public middle schools in Kansas
Schools in Coffey County, Kansas